Second-seed José Luis Clerc retained the title by defeating Ivan Lendl in the final and claimed first prize money of $32,000.

Seeds
A champion seed is indicated in bold text while text in italics indicates the round in which that seed was eliminated.

  Ivan Lendl (final)
  José Luis Clerc (champion)
  Guillermo Vilas (semifinals)
  Harold Solomon (second round)
  Mel Purcell (quarterfinals)
  José Higueras (third round)
  Tomáš Šmíd (second round)
  Eddie Dibbs (first round)
  Hans Gildemeister (third round)
  José Luis Damiani (quarterfinals)
  Terry Moor (first round)
  Mario Martinez (first round)
  Heinz Günthardt (second round)
  Shlomo Glickstein (third round)
  Mark Edmondson (third round)
  Ricardo Ycaza (withdrew — expecting child)

Draw

Finals

Top half

Section 1

Section 2

Bottom half

Section 3

Section 4

References

External links

U.S. Clay Court Championships
1981 U.S. Clay Court Championships